86 is an anime series based on the light novel series of the same name written by Asato Asato and illustrated by Shirabii. The series adaptation was announced in a livestream commemorating the first anniversary of Kadokawa's "Kimirano" light novel website on March 15, 2020. It is produced by A-1 Pictures and directed by Toshimasa Ishii, with Toshiya Ōno writing the scripts, Tetsuya Kawakami designing the characters, and Hiroyuki Sawano and Kohta Yamamoto composing the music. The CG is developed by Shirogumi.

The series was originally scheduled to air in 2020, but it was indefinitely delayed. The series is a split-cour anime, with the first half airing on Tokyo MX and other stations from April 11 to June 20, 2021. On March 28, 2021, Tokyo MX broadcast a special program commemorating the start of the series starring main cast Shōya Chiba and Ikumi Hasegawa, producer Nobuhiro Nakayama and music composer Hiroyuki Sawano. The second half aired from October 3, 2021 to March 19, 2022. The first opening theme is "3-bun 29-byō" ( 3 minutes 29 seconds) by Hitorie, while the first ending theme is "Avid" by SawanoHiroyuki[nZk]:mizuki and the second theme is "Hands Up to the Sky" by SawanoHiroyuki[nZk]:Laco.  The second opening theme is "Kyōkaisen" ( Boundary Line) by amazarashi, while the third ending theme is "Alchemila" by Regal Lily.

Crunchyroll licensed the series outside of Asia for an English simulcast and simuldub. Muse Communication licensed the series in Southeast Asia and is streaming it on iQIYI and Bilibili.


Episode list

Home media release

Notes

References

86